= Jayden Wade =

American football player

IMG Ascenders
- Position: Quarterback

Personal information
- Listed height: 6 ft 3 in (1.91 m)
- Listed weight: 190 lb (86 kg)

Career information
- High school: IMG Academy (Bradenton, Florida)

Jayden Wade is an American football quarterback at IMG Academy in Bradenton, Florida.

== Early life ==
Wade is from Los Angeles, California, and was raised by his single mother. He grew up playing football as a quarterback and from age eight received instruction at Laced Facts Academy from former Louisville player Mike Evans. Wade received his first offers to play NCAA Division I college football while in seventh grade. In eighth grade, he moved to Florida to attend IMG Academy in Bradenton, known for its sports programs. That year, he was a backup quarterback and completed 14 of 20 passes for 199 yards and a touchdown.

In 2024, as a freshman, Wade was a backup to Ty Hawkins but also started a game, becoming IMG's first freshman starter at the position in three years. In his only start, Wade ran for a 43-yard touchdown and threw for 221 yards and three scores. Wade won a starting role as a sophomore at IMG in 2025, throwing for 1,383 yards and 20 touchdowns to two interceptions while also running for 243 yards and three scores. He quarterbacked IMG to an undefeated 9–0 record.

Wade is a five-star recruit and the top-ranked quarterback in the class of 2028. In November 2025, he committed to play college football for the Georgia Bulldogs.
